A dragonfly is a flying insect of the order Odonata.

Dragonfly or DragonFly may also refer to:

Aircraft
 Boeing X-50 Dragonfly, an unmanned aerial surveillance vehicle designed by the U.S. military
 Cessna A-37 Dragonfly, a US attack aircraft
 Castiglioni Dragon Fly 333 (Dragon Fly 333), an Italian helicopter
 DF Helicopters DF334 (Dragon Fly 334), an Italian helicopter
 De Havilland Dragonfly, a British aircraft
 Dornier Do 12 Libelle III (Dragonfly III), a German flying boat
 Flylight Dragonfly, a British ultralight trike design
 FlyTech Dragonfly, a remote-controlled flying toy ornithopter
 Glasflügel Libelle, a glider, German for dragonfly
 Moyes Dragonfly, an Australian ultralight aircraft
 Sikorsky H-5, a US helicopter sometimes called Dragonfly
 Westland Dragonfly, the UK version of the Sikorsky H-5
 Viking Dragonfly, an experimental equal-area canard airplane

Spacecraft
 DragonFly (capsule), a prototype reusable launch vehicle by SpaceX
 Dragonfly (spacecraft), a planned NASA mission to Titan featuring a rotorcraft and lander

Computing
 DragonFly BSD, an operating system
 Opera Dragonfly, a web developer tool integrated in the Opera browser
 Dragonfly (search engine), a prototype

Film and television
 Dragonfly (1976 film) or One Summer Love, a romantic drama starring Beau Bridges and Susan Sarandon
 The Man from Hong Kong (US title The Dragon Flies), a 1975 action film
 Dragonfly (2001 film), by Marius Holst
 Dragonfly (2002 film), directed by Tom Shadyac
 Dragonflies (film), a 2022 Spanish drama film

In print
 Dragonfly (Durbin novel), a 1999 novel by Frederic S. Durbin
 Dragonfly (Koontz novel), a 1975 novel by Dean Koontz
 Dragonfly: NASA and the Crisis Aboard Mir, a book by Bryan Burrough
 "Dragonfly", a short story in Tales from Earthsea by Ursula K. Le Guin

Fictional characters
 Dragonfly (AC Comics), a superheroine
 Dragonfly (Marvel Comics), a supervillainess

Music
 Dragonfly (band), from Croatia
 Dragonfly, a female singer featured on Bob Sinclar's 2012 song "Rock the Boat"

Albums
 Dragonfly (Ego Likeness album)
 Dragonfly (Jimmy Giuffre album)
 Dragonfly (Kasey Chambers album), 2017
 Dragonfly (Masami Okui album)
 Dragonfly (Strawbs album), also the title song
 Dragonfly (Ziggy Marley album), also the title song
 Dragon Fly (album), by Jefferson Starship

Songs
 "Dragonfly" (Fleetwood Mac song)
 "Dragonfly" (Hitomi Shimatani song)
 "Dragonfly", by a-ha from Lifelines
 "Dragonfly", by Trey Anastasio from Bar 17
 "Dragonfly", by Blondie from The Hunter
 "Dragonfly", by Cherona from Sound of Cherona 
 "Dragonfly", by Clutch from The Elephant Riders
 "Dragonfly", by Edguy from Tinnitus Sanctus
 "Dragonfly", by Mahogany Rush from Mahogany Rush IV
 "Dragonfly", by Yngwie Malmsteen from Fire and Ice
 "Dragonfly", by The Nolans from Altogether
 "Dragonfly", by Pentangle from Open The Door
 "Dragonfly", by Shaman's Harvest from Shine
 "Dragonfly", by Red House Painters from Red House Painters (Rollercoaster)
 "Dragonfly", by SMiLE.dk from Future Girls
 "Dragonfly", by Caligula's Horse from Bloom

Other uses
 Dragonfly Creek, a stream in the Presidio of San Francisco, California, U.S.
 Dragonfly Trimarans, a line of trimarans built in Denmark
 Dragonfly (chess variant), a chess variant invented by Christian Freeling 
 Dragonfly, a nightclub at St James Power Station, Singapore
 Dragonfly (G.I. Joe), a fictional make of helicopter in the G.I. Joe: A Real American Hero toyline
 Dragonfly Telephoto Array, a telescope array that uses a combination of telephoto lenses.
 The Dragonfly, a short ballet by Anna Pavlova
 Dragonfly (company), a South Korean video game developer

See also
 Bromo-DragonFLY, a psychoactive drug
 Dragon Flyz, an American animated TV series
 DragonflyTV, an American educational children's series